This is a list of monuments in Kaski District, Nepal as officially recognized by and available through the website of the Department of Archaeology, Nepal. Kaski is a district of Gandaki Province and is located in western central Nepal. Hindu temples are the main attraction of this district.

List of monuments

|}

See also 
 List of monuments in Gandaki Province
 List of monuments in Nepal

References

External links

Kaski